Dwarf azalea is a common name for several species of Rhododendron:

Rhododendron atlanticum, native to the eastern United States
Rhododendron kiusianum,  native to Japan
Rhododendron minus, the Piedmont Rhododendron
Rhododendron nakaharai, native to Taiwan